Mutare Museum is a museum in Mutare, Zimbabwe. It is one of the four national museums of Zimbabwe and was initially established as a society in 1954 before becoming a national museum in 1959.

See also 
 List of museums in Zimbabwe

References

Museums in Zimbabwe
Mutare
Buildings and structures in Manicaland Province
Tourist attractions in Manicaland Province